Dennis Vanendert (born 27 June 1988) is a Belgian professional road bicycle racer and cyclo-cross rider, who last rode for UCI ProTeam . His elder brother Jelle is also a professional cyclist, and also competed for  team.

Born in Neerpelt, Vanendert has been competing as a professional since the start of the 2012 season, joining  from Italian amateur squad UC Pistoiese Cecchi Logistica. Vanendert made his Grand Tour début at the 2012 Giro d'Italia, as one of three new professionals alongside Gaëtan Bille and Brian Bulgaç. During the eighteenth stage, Vanendert was part of the bunch sprint, and eventually finished in tenth place.

Major results

2005
 2nd Overall Tour du Valromey
 2nd Koppenbergcross Junior
2006
 1st  Junior race, National Cyclo-cross Championships
2008
 2nd Romsée–Stavelot–Romsée
 9th Izegem
2009
 3rd Beverbeek Classic
 5th Zuidkempense Pijl
 5th Memorial Noël Soetaert
 8th Memorial Fred De Bruyne
2010
 1st Aalst bij Sint Truiden
 2nd Trofee van Haspengouw
 5th Flèche Ardennaise
 5th Circuit du Hainaut
 8th Buggenhout
2011
 3rd Giro del Medio Brenta
 3rd Gran Premio Vivaisti Cenaiesi
 4th Pistoia–Fiorano
 5th Trofeo Pedalata Elettrica
 6th Giro del Valdarno
 6th Trofeo Società Ciclistica Corsanico
 6th Giro del Pratomagno
 7th Coppa Comune di Castelfranco di Sopra
 8th Coppa Bologna
 8th Trofeo Nesti e Nelli Concessionaria Toyota
 8th Giro del Montalbano
 10th Classica di Colbuccaro
2013
 8th Clásica de Almería
2015
 9th Grote Prijs Jef Scherens

References

External links
Lotto-Belisol profile

Cycling Quotient profile

Belgian male cyclists
1988 births
Living people
People from Neerpelt
Cyclists from Limburg (Belgium)